was a Japanese karateka from Hyōgo Prefecture.

Yamada was one of the karateka representing the Shōwa period, the founder of the Japanese Kenpo Karate-do.
He was the first person wearing a glove in Japan, a direct batting game with no armor, was also known to leave a result that will lead to the birth of full contact karate and kickboxing later.

Bibliography

小沼保『本部朝基正伝　琉球拳法空手術達人(増補 )』壮神社 2000年 
巨椋修『実戦！ケンカ空手家列伝』福昌堂 1996年 
金城裕編『月刊空手道』（合本復刻版）榕樹書林 1997年

References

External links 
The Birth of competition karate and national organizations

1905 births
1967 deaths
Japanese male karateka
People from Hyōgo Prefecture
20th-century philanthropists
Deaths from liver cancer
Martial arts school founders